The Mound City News (sometimes called the Mound City News-Independent) is a local newspaper published in Mound City, Missouri, serving Holt County.  It reports a circulation of 2,400 The paper has been publishing weekly since 1879 and currently releases its publication on Thursday each week.  The publication claims roots back to 1879.

External links
 Mound City News official web page

References

Newspapers published in Missouri
Holt County, Missouri